The 2012–13 Western Michigan Broncos men's basketball team represented Western Michigan University during the 2012–13 NCAA Division I men's basketball season. The Broncos, led by tenth year head coach Steve Hawkins, played their home games at the University Arena and were members of the West Division of the Mid-American Conference. They finished the season 22–13, 10–6 in MAC play to be champions of the West Division. They advanced to the semifinals of the MAC tournament where they lost to Ohio. They were invited to the 2013 College Basketball Invitational where they defeated North Dakota State and Wyoming to advance to the semifinals where they lost to George Mason.

Roster

Schedule

|-
!colspan=9| Exhibition

|-
!colspan=9| Regular season

|-
!colspan=9| 2013 MAC tournament

|-
! colspan=9 | 2013 College Basketball Invitational

References

Western Michigan Broncos men's basketball seasons
Western Michigan
Western Michigan